The veined catfish (Arius venosus), also known as the marine catfish, is a species of sea catfish in the family Ariidae. It was described by Achille Valenciennes in 1840. It inhabits tropical marine and brackish waters in the Indo-western Pacific region, including the Mozambique Channel, Myanmar, Indonesia and southern China.

The diet of the veined catfish includes finfish and benthic crustaceans. It is of commercial interest to fisheries; it is generally marketed fresh.

References

veined catfish
veined catfish
Fish of the Indian Ocean
Fish of Vietnam
Marine fauna of East Africa
Marine fish of Asia
Marine fauna of Southeast Asia

Taxa named by Achille Valenciennes
veined catfish